Belisario Domínguez was a Mexican physician and politician. Belisario Domínguez may also refer to:

Belisario Domínguez Medal of Honor, highest award bestowed by the Mexican Senate
Belisario Domínguez Dam, embankment dam and hydroelectric power station on the Grijalva River
Belisario Domínguez Municipality, municipality in the Mexican state of Chiapas